Mallosia mirabilis is a species of beetle in the family Cerambycidae. It was described by Faldermann in 1837. It is known from Iraq, Turkey and Iran.

Subspecies
 Mallosia mirabilis mirabilis Faldermann, 1837
 Mallosia mirabilis devexula Holzschuh, 1989

References

Saperdini
Beetles described in 1837